Tom Daemen (born 17 June 1985) is a Dutch former professional footballer who played as a midfielder. He  formerly played for Fortuna Sittard, MVV, NEC and Go Ahead Eagles in his native Netherlands and Cypriot teams AEK Larnaca, Enosis Neon Paralimni, Aris Limassol.

Club career
Daemen was born in Brunssum, and rose through the ranks of local amateur side, BVC' 28 Bingelrade and later professional club Fortuna Sittard. Daemen made his professional debut on 25 October 2002 against Helmond Sport, where he came in as a substitute in a 4-1 away defeat.

In 2006, Daemen moved to another Limburgian club, MVV Maastricht. Here he became captain of the team, and often had the honour of receiving the prize of best player.

In 2012, Daemen moved abroad to play for Cypriot outfit AEK Larnaca alongside compatriots Tim de Cler, Gregoor van Dijk and Edwin Linssen and with Leon Vlemmings at the helm. Finding it hard to earn a place in the starting line-up, he was snapped up by another Dutchman, Ton Caanen, at EN Paralimni. Then, Caanen took Daemen with him to Aris Limassol the following season.

He returned to the Netherlands in 2014 and joined high-flying Eerste Divisie club NEC, only to leave them after a season for Go Ahead Eagles. 

After he renounced a transfer to FC Den Bosch in August 2017, Daemen no longer found a club. In February 2018, he started working as a commercial employee at MVV Maastricht. He left that position in June 2021.

Honours

Club
NEC
Eerste Divisie: 2014–15

References

External links
Profile at Voetbal International

1985 births
Living people
People from Brunssum
Association football midfielders
Dutch footballers
Fortuna Sittard players
MVV Maastricht players
AEK Larnaca FC players
Enosis Neon Paralimni FC players
NEC Nijmegen players
Go Ahead Eagles players
Eerste Divisie players
Cypriot First Division players
Dutch expatriate footballers
Expatriate footballers in Cyprus
Dutch expatriate sportspeople in Cyprus
Footballers from Limburg (Netherlands)